Korah was a battle honour awarded to units of the forces of British India that took part in the Battle of Korah in 1776.

In May, 1776, a British force under Lieut-Col John Neville Parker was sent from Belgram, in Oudh, to monitor the activities of one Mabub Khan, a disaffected officer of the Nawab of Oudh, stationed at Korah (about 25 miles from Cawnpore) with seven battalions of troops and 19 guns. On June 10, 1776, Col Parker sent a demand that the guns be surrendered and, when this demand was refused, the British attacked. In a brief, but bloody, engagement, Mabub Khan's troops were defeated and the guns captured.

The award was made to the 1st and 10th Regiments of Bengal Native Infantry.

See also
Battle honours of the British and Imperial Armies

References

Battle honours of the British Army